Bishop of Gippsland may refer to:

 Anglican Bishop of Gippsland
 Bishop of the Roman Catholic Diocese of Sale